Laudenbach is a river of Hesse, Germany. It runs predominantly in northerly direction entirely by rural districts and agricultural areas of Großalmerode. It is a right tributary of the Gelster.

See also
List of rivers of Hesse

Rivers of Hesse
Rivers of Germany